Malcolm Griffin (July 9, 1877 – October 18, 1948) was an American football player and coach. He served as the head football coach at the University of Alabama in 1900, compiling a record of 2–3. He married Maria Washington Tucker in 1914. He was later a fruit grower in Bedford County.

Head coaching record

References

External links
 

1877 births
1948 deaths
19th-century players of American football
Alabama Crimson Tide football coaches
Virginia Cavaliers football players
People from Bedford, Virginia